The 1980 Canadian Open was the seventh edition of the professional invitational snooker tournament, the Canadian Open, which took place in August 1980. This was the last time the tournament was played until 1985, when the tournament was rebranded as the Canadian Masters.

Cliff Thorburn won the title for the fourth time, beating Terry Griffiths 17–10 in the final.


Main draw

References

1980 in snooker
Open
Open